Katia is located in the Egyptian Sinai Desert. In 1916, the Battle of Katia was fought there between the forces of the British Empire defending the Suez Canal and the invading Ottoman Turkish Empire.

Populated places in North Sinai Governorate